The Arkansas Centennial half dollar was minted from 1935 to 1939.

The Arkansas-Robinson half dollar, a special issue of the coin featuring a different design, was minted in 1936.

See also
 List of United States commemorative coins and medals (1930s)
 Half dollar (United States coin)

References

External links
 

Birds in art
Early United States commemorative coins
Fifty-cent coins